DZVR (711 AM) Bombo Radyo is a radio station owned and operated by Bombo Radyo Philippines through its licensee Newsounds Broadcasting Network. Its studio, offices and transmitter are located at Bombo Radyo Broadcast Center, Brgy. Cabungaan North, Laoag. It airs daily from 4:00 AM to 9:30 PM.

DZVR was formerly owned by Northern Broadcasting Company from its inception in 1967 until 1989, when it was acquired by Bombo Radyo.

References

Radio stations established in 1967
News and talk radio stations in the Philippines
Radio stations in Ilocos Norte